

Track listing

Personnel
Musicians
Lucky Peterson – Vocals, Guitar, Hammond B3, Keyboards
Tamara Peterson – Vocals
Shawn Kellerman - Guitar
Timothy Lee Waites - Bass
Raul Valdes - Drums 

2012 live albums